Fabrice Dimitri Pancrate (born 2 May 1980) is a French former professional footballer who played as a midfielder.

Club career

Career in France
Pancrate started his professional career in Louhans-Cuiseaux in 1999, where he played two matches. Then, he joined En Avant Guingamp, where he stayed from 2000 until 2002, playing six matches. After his spell at Guingamp, he was transferred to Le Mans, where he scored eight times in 64 appearances.

Paris Saint-Germain and loans
On 2 August 2004, Pancrate was sold to Paris Saint-Germain for £2,000,000 and played 91 matches, scoring 10 in the domestic league. In 2007, he went on loan from February until May to Real Betis in the Spanish La Liga, playing his first match against Athletic Bilbao on 4 February. Pancrate was again sent on loan for the 2007–08 season, this time to Sochaux. After five years, he was released by Paris Saint-Germain.

Newcastle United
On 21 November 2009, Pancrate signed a contract with Newcastle until the end of the season with an option to extend. He was given the number 21 shirt. In January 2010, Newcastle signed up fellow right winger Wayne Routledge from Queens Park Rangers on a long-term deal, putting Pancrate's future in doubt, with many Toon fans doubting his ability.

Pancrate made his debut for Newcastle, coming on as a substitute, in a 3–0 win over Swansea City. He scored his first goal on 5 December 2009, after producing an impressive bit of skill, before mullering the ball in off the crossbar, in a 2–0 home victory over Watford, after coming on as a substitute. He has also set up goals for Ryan Taylor in games against Coventry City and Preston North End.

Pancrate was released at the end of the season.

Honours
Paris Saint-Germain
Coupe de France: 2005–06

Newcastle United
Football League Championship; promotion to the FA Premier League: 2009–10

References

External links

1980 births
Living people
Footballers from Paris
Association football midfielders
French footballers
French people of Martiniquais descent
French expatriate footballers
Expatriate footballers in Spain
Expatriate footballers in England
French expatriate sportspeople in Spain
French expatriate sportspeople in England
Louhans-Cuiseaux FC players
En Avant Guingamp players
Le Mans FC players
Paris Saint-Germain F.C. players
Real Betis players
Newcastle United F.C. players
FC Nantes players
Ligue 1 players
Ligue 2 players
La Liga players
English Football League players
Expatriate footballers in Greece